Andreas Mavris  (born 21 March 1972) is a former Cypriot goalkeeper currently a Goalkeeping coach for AEL Limassol of Cyprus working closely with manager Pambos Christodoulou, previously he was coach at Olympiakos Nicosia and Doxa Katokopias. His former teams as a goalkeeper were AEK Larnaca, THOI Lakatamia, Olympiakos Nicosia, Alki Larnaca FC and Doxa Katokopias .

External links
 

1972 births
Living people
Olympiakos Nicosia players
AEK Larnaca FC players
ENTHOI Lakatamia FC players
Alki Larnaca FC players
Doxa Katokopias FC players
Cypriot footballers
Cyprus international footballers
Association football goalkeepers
People from Larnaca